The Morocco International is an international badminton tournament held in Morocco since 2010. The first tournament has been an International Series level.

Previous winners

References

Badminton tournaments in Morocco
Sports competitions in Morocco